This article is an incomplete list of stamp catalogs.

 AFA specialkatalog: Danmark, Færøerne, Grønland, Dansk Vestindien og Slesvig (Denmark)
 Afinsa (Portugal)
 Anfils (Spain)
 Australasian stamp catalogue (Australia)
 Austria Netto Katalog (ANK) (Austria)
 BALE (Israel)
 Barefoot Catalogue (Revenues)
 Bolaffi (Italy)
 Borek (World catalogue)
 Brusden-White (Australia)
 Burak Pul Evi Kataloğu - Spesyalize Türk Pullari Kataloğu (Specialized Postage Stamp Catalog of Turkey)
 Burak Pul Evi Yayinlari - Ilk Türk Pullari / Tugrali Pullar (The First Turkish Stamps Stamps with the monogram of the Sultans)
 Catabooks Publishing - Thematic Catalogs / Gandhi Stamp Catalog (The First India theme based Stamp Caatalogs)
 Catalogue of USSR postage stamps (Soviet Union, Russia; Каталог почтовых марок СССР)
 Campbell Paterson (New Zealand)
 Chan Stamp Catalogue of China (1878-1949)
 CEI (Italy)
 Cérès (France)
 Chuchin, F.G. (Russia - Zemstvos)
 Colnect (online only)
 Comprehensive Colour Catalogue of Australian Stamps
 Dallay (France)
 Domfil (Spain)
 Edifil (Spain)
 Facit catalog (all countries of Scandinavia)
 Farahbakhash Catalogue Of 2010: The Stamps Of Iran – Qajar, Pahlavi, Islamic Republic Of Iran (Iran)
 Fischer catalog (Poland)
 Find Your Stamps Value (online only) (specializing in US, GB, and other stamps)
 Freestampcatalogue
 Froede (Germany, active to 1941)
 Hellas 2012: stamp catalogue and postal history = katalogos grammatosēmōn kai tachydromikē historia (Greece)
 Hermes (Greece)
 Hibernian (Ireland)
 Holmes (Canada, published from 1935 to 1968)
 Inoubli (Tunisia)
 Isfila (Turkey)
 Jacobs, V.A. (Russia - USSR special catalogue)
 JB Catalogue (Malta)
 JSCA Japanese Stamp Specialized Catalog (Japan)
 JSDA Japanese Stamp Dealers’ Association Catalogue (Japan)
 Katalog Prangko Indonesia = Indonesian postage stamp catalogue (Indonesia)
 LAPE (Finland)
 Len Jury Stamp catalogue - New Zealand
 Stamps NZ - New Zealand 
 Lipsia (until 1990), only stamp catalog of the DDR. (Editor: Verlag Transpress Leipzig, DDR)
 Livingston "Catalog of the Shanghai Postal System" (Wei-Liang Chow 2nd edition 1990)/(L.F. Livingston First edition 1971)
 Ma's Illustrated Catalogue Of The Stamps Of China (China)
 MacDonnell Whyte (Stamps of Ireland Specialised Catalogue)
 Magyar Posta és Illetékbélyeg Katalógus (Hungary)
 Maury (France), A specialized catalog of France formed from the combination of Cérès and Dallay
 Michel catalog (Germany)
 Mundifil Postage Stamps of Portugal and Colonies
 Minkus (USA, active until 2004)
 Newfoundland specialized stamp catalogue (Canada)
 Ngo’s Catalogue of Philippine Republic Stamps & Postal Stationeries (Philippine)
 Norgeskatalogen (Norway)
 Norma Norma [year] – a specialized catalog of Finland postage stamps published annually, tri-lingual (Finnish, Swedish, English)
 NVPH Speciale Catalogus (The Netherlands & colonies)
 OBP-COB (Belgium)
Phila India (India)
 Philex (Germany)
 Pofis catalogue (Czechoslovakia)
 Postage Stamps Catalogue of the People's Republic of China  (China), China Posts and Telecom Press
 Prifix (Luxembourg)
 Pulko Osmali İmpararatorluğu ve Türkiye Cumhuriyeti Posta Pullari Kataloğu (Ottoman Empire and Republic of Turkey Postage Stamp Catalog)
 Pulhan: Türk Pullari Kataloğu (Turkey Postage Stamp Catalog)
 Richard Zimmermann Catalog (The joint stamp issues catalog)
 Ruch catalog (Poland)
 Sakura Catalogue of Japanese Stamps (Japan)
 Sanabria's Air Post Catalogue (Worldwide airmail stamps; last full catalog, 1966; partial, 1972)
 Sassone (Italy)
 Schiffer catalog: Catálogo de Selos do Brasil (Brazil)
 Scott catalogue (USA)
 Sellos postales argentinos: 1856-2010 (Argentina)
 Standard Catalogue of Malaysia, Singapore, Brunei, Steven Tan, International Stamp & Coin Sdn. Bhd.
 V.U. Soloviev (Russia)
 Siddiqui Stamps Catalogue (Pakistan)
 The South African stamp colour catalogue (South Africa)
 Stanley Gibbons (Great Britain)
 Suriwongse (Sakserm) until 2004 (Thailand)
 Thai Stamps Catalogue (Thailand), Somchai Saeng-Ngern
 Taiwan Color Catalogue, Alex Yeh
 Umungwan Korean Postage Stamp Catalogue (South Korea)
 Unificato (Italy)
 Unitrade Specialized Catalogue of Canadian Stamps
 Yang (Hong Kong, Liberated areas, PRC)
 Yvert et Tellier (France)
  (Russia)
 Zonnebloem (stamp catalogue) (Netherlands, Indonesia, Israel, Surinam, United Europe)
 Zumstein (Switzerland)

Notes

Reference material lists